Burned Hearts is a 2007 Moroccan film directed by Ahmed El Maanouni.

Synopsis 
Amin, a young architect who lives in Paris, returns suddenly to his hometown, Fès, Morocco, where his uncle is dying. He has not spoken to the man who brought him up since he left his hometown ten years earlier to study and settle in Paris. The visits of the young architect to the hospital revive the deep wounds of his painful childhood. His long-time friend, the craftsman Aziz, exhorts him not to surrender to past resentments. His uncle's death does not soothe the young man's pains, forcing him to look for answers within his soul.

Awards 
 Tanger 2007
 Dubai 2007

External links 

 

2007 films
2007 drama films
Moroccan drama films